Herat (also Romanized as Herāt; also, Burd Herat, also Romanized as Būrd Harāt and Būrd Herāt; also, Harāt Khowreh and Herāt-i-Khurreh; formerly, Tājābād and Tājābād-e Harāt) is a city in the Central District of Khatam County, Yazd province, Iran, and serves as capital of the county. At the 2006 census, its population was 10,795 in 2,751 households. The following census in 2011 counted 12,392 people in 3,357 households. The latest census in 2016 showed a population of 13,032 people in 3,834 households.

References 

Khatam County

Cities in Yazd Province

Populated places in Yazd Province

Populated places in Khatam County